
Paul Gustav Völckers (15 March 1891  – 25 January 1946) was a German General of the Infantry in the Wehrmacht during World War II who commanded the XXVII Army Corps. He was a recipient of the Knight's Cross of the Iron Cross of Nazi Germany.

Völckers surrendered to the Red Army in the course of the Soviet 1944 Operation Bagration. He died in a POW camp in the Soviet Union in 1946.

Awards 

 Knight's Cross of the Iron Cross on  11 December 1942 as Generalleutnant and commander of 78. Infanterie-Division

References

Citations

Bibliography

 

1891 births
1946 deaths
German Army generals of World War II
Generals of Infantry (Wehrmacht)
German Army personnel of World War I
Recipients of the clasp to the Iron Cross, 1st class
Recipients of the Gold German Cross
Recipients of the Knight's Cross of the Iron Cross
German prisoners of war in World War II held by the Soviet Union
German people who died in Soviet detention
Military personnel from Kiel
People from the Province of Schleswig-Holstein
Reichswehr personnel